Bely Yar is the name of several inhabited localities in Russia.

Modern localities
Urban localities
Bely Yar, Khanty-Mansi Autonomous Okrug, an urban-type settlement in Surgutsky District of Khanty-Mansi Autonomous Okrug
Bely Yar, Verkhneketsky District, Tomsk Oblast, a work settlement in Verkhneketsky District, Tomsk Oblast

Rural localities
Bely Yar, Amur Oblast, a selo in Beloyarovsky Rural Settlement of Zavitinsky District of Amur Oblast
Bely Yar, Kaliningrad Oblast, a settlement under the administrative jurisdiction of the town of district significance of Pravdinsk in Pravdinsky District of Kaliningrad Oblast
Bely Yar, Republic of Khakassia, a selo in Beloyarsky Selsoviet of Altaysky District of the Republic of Khakassia
Bely Yar (selo), Achinsky District, Krasnoyarsk Krai, a selo in Beloyarsky Selsoviet of Achinsky District of Krasnoyarsk Krai
Bely Yar (settlement), Achinsky District, Krasnoyarsk Krai, a settlement in Beloyarsky Selsoviet of Achinsky District of Krasnoyarsk Krai
Bely Yar, Kuraginsky District, Krasnoyarsk Krai, a village in Murinsky Selsoviet of Kuraginsky District of Krasnoyarsk Krai
Bely Yar, Kurgan Oblast, a village in Bolshechausovsky Selsoviet of Ketovsky District of Kurgan Oblast
Bely Yar, Omsk Oblast, a settlement in Beloyarsky Rural Okrug of Tevrizsky District of Omsk Oblast
Bely Yar, Sverdlovsk Oblast, a settlement in Artyomovsky District of Sverdlovsk Oblast
Bely Yar, Teguldetsky District, Tomsk Oblast, a settlement in Teguldetsky District, Tomsk Oblast

Historical localities

See also
Beloyarsky (disambiguation)
Beloyarsk